Pierpont is an unincorporated community in central Pierpont Township, Ashtabula County, Ohio, United States.  It has a post office with the ZIP code 44082. Served by Area Code 440 Exchange 577.  Pierpont is at the intersection of State Routes 7 and 167.

The community has the name of Pierpont Edwards, a Connecticut Land Company agent.

Pierpont served as a stop on Representative Tim Ryan’s campaign for the 2022 United States Senate election in Ohio. Ryan visited the area on Saturday, July 10 2021.

References

Unincorporated communities in Ohio
Unincorporated communities in Ashtabula County, Ohio